Grigori Yuryevich Petrovski (born 16 August 1979) is a Russian former pair skater. With partner Viktoria Shliakhova, he is the 1999 ISU Junior Grand Prix Final bronze medalist and a two-time Winter Universiade bronze medalist (1999, 2001).

Programs 
(with Shliakhova)

Results 
(with Shliakhova)

References 

1981 births
Russian male pair skaters
Universiade medalists in figure skating
Living people
Sportspeople from Perm, Russia
Universiade bronze medalists for Russia
Competitors at the 1999 Winter Universiade
Competitors at the 2001 Winter Universiade